Three-time defending champion David Wagner and his partner Lucas Sithole defeated the other two-time defending champion Andrew Lapthorne and his partner Dylan Alcott in the final, 6–1, 6–3 to win the quad doubles wheelchair tennis title at the 2016 Australian Open.

Seeds

Draw

References
 Main Draw

Wheelchair Quad Doubles
2016 Quad Doubles